Muzaffargarh (Urdu and ) is a city in the province of Punjab, Pakistan. Located on the bank of the Chenab River, it is the capital of the district with the same name. It is the 39th largest city of Pakistan by population.

History
The Muzaffargarh region was an agricultural and forested area during the rule of the Indus Valley civilization. Then came the Vedic period, which was characterized by the introduction of Indo-Aryan culture from into the Punjab province. Over time, several other civilizations came to power in the ancient town and surrounding district: the Kambojas, the Daradas, the Kekayas, the Madras, the Pauravas, the Yaudheyas, the Malavas and the Kurus. After the fall of the Achaemenid Empire in 331 BCE, Alexander the Great marched into the present-day Punjab province with an army of 50,000 men. The Muzaffargarh region was, during different time periods, also ruled by the Maurya Empire, the Indo-Greek kingdom, the Kushan Empire, the Gupta Empire, the White Huns, the Kushano-Hephthalites, and the Turk and Hindu Shahi kingdoms.

In 997 CE, Sultan Mahmud Ghaznavi took over the Ghaznavid Empire, and, in 1005, conquered the Shahis in Kabul, which granted him power over the Punjab region. The Delhi Sultanate and later the Mughal Empire also ruled the region. The location of the present-day town became predominantly Muslim during this time because of the arrival of missionary Sufis whose dargahs still persist in the area.

After the decline of the Mughal Empire, the Sikhs conquered the Muzaffargarh District. Later, in 1848, the British Raj assumed control of the area.

In 1794, the town of Muzaffargarh was founded by governor of Multan, Nawab Muzaffar Khan, who was also the Governor of Multan at the time. The meaning of the word is "Fort of Muzaffar" because the "historic district" lies within the walls of a fort built by the governor.  In 1864, it became the capital of the Muzaffargarh District.

The place was also referred to as Kala Pani (Black Water), as it is located between two rivers: the Indus and the Chenab. It was linked to the surrounding lands by bridges during the British era.

During the independence movement of Pakistan, the Muslim population supported the Muslim League and the Pakistani Movement.  In 1947, after Pakistan gained independence, the minority Hindus and Sikhs migrated to India while the Muslim refugees from India settled in Muzaffargarh.

Geography and climate

Muzaffargarh was hit especially hard by the 2010 Pakistan floods, given its position between the Chenab and Indus rivers.
Muzaffargarh is located at almost the exact geographical center of Pakistan. The closest major city is Multan. The area around the city is a flat alluvial plain and is ideal for agriculture, with many citrus and mango farms. There are also canals that cut across the Muzaffargarh District, providing water to farms. During the monsoon season, the land close to the Chenab is usually flooded.

Muzaffargarh features an arid climate with very hot summers and mild winters. The city has experienced some of the most extreme weather in Pakistan. Dust storms are a common occurrence within the city.

Cultural heritage sites

 Tomb of Tahir Khan Nahar
 Tomb of Sheikh Sadan Shaheed

Transportation
Muzaffargarh has connections with other cities by several means of transportation.

Road

Buses to Multan leave frequently, because of their close proximity to each other. There are also buses that travel to more distant destinations. The N-70 National Highway connects the city to the other parts of Pakistan. This highway allows for direct travel to Rawalpindi, Islamabad, Faisalabad, Karachi, Lahore, and Bahawalpur.

Railways

Muzaffargarh is connected by rail with all parts of Pakistan, as it lies on the branch track between Rawalpindi, Multan, Mianwali and Attock. The main Peshawar-Karachi railway line passes through Multan District.

Power plants

Muzaffargarh Nuclear Power Complex
According to the Wall Street Journal, the Pakistan Atomic Energy Commission (PAEC) plans to install three nuclear reactors at Muzaffargarh. The Muzaffargarh Nuclear Power Complex will have a production capacity of 1100 megawatts.

Muzaffargarh Thermal Power Plant 
Muzaffargarh has three units of electricity producing 1350 Mega Watt. The plant operates on fuel but The Russian company has signed an agreement to give imported coal to run a thermal units. At first, the upgradation of the thermal power plant was included in CPEC projects but in 2017, Chine excluded it from the agreement due to unclear reasons. The location is almost  from the main city of Muzaffargarh.

Notable places

Fayyaz Park
Fayyaz Park Muzaffargarh is only one Park in the city. This is situated in the center of the city. This park was named after ex-Deputy Commissioner Muzaffargarh Fayyaz Bashir. Recently the park has been upgraded and made ready for families to walk and spend their time with families. Fayyaz park is located near Katchehry Chowk beside National Bank Main city branch.Place of park was previously the residence of Deputy Commissioner.

Notable people

 Nawab Muzaffar Khan, founder of Muzaffargarh
 Sardar Kaure Khan Jatoi, leading personality for his social services
 Mushtaq Ahmed Gurmani, former governor of West Pakistan
 Nawabzada Nasrullah Khan, A prominent political figure in Pakistan
 Hina Rabbani Khar, former Foreign Minister and the first female foreign minister
 Ghulam Mustafa Khar, former Governor of Punjab and former Chief Minister of Punjab
 Ghulam Noor Rabbani Khar, politician
 Sultan Mehmood, politician
 Jamshed Dasti, politician
 Azhar Hussain, wrestler

References

External links

 Website of Muzaffargarh

Populated places established in 1794
1794 establishments in India